Santa Maria della Salute is a 2016 Serbian biographical film about the Serbian poet Laza Kostić.

Cast 
 Vojin Ćetković – Laza Kostić
  – 
 Sloboda Mićalović – Olga Dunđerski
  – Sofija Dunđerski 
  – 
 Nebojša Ilić – Dr. Milan Savić
  – Julijana Palanački
 Aleksandar Berček – Arhimandrit Gavrilo
 Svetlana Bojković – Ana Palanački

References

External links 

2010s biographical films
Serbian biographical films
Cultural depictions of Serbian men
Films directed by Zdravko Šotra